Sigy-en-Bray (literally Sigy in Bray) is a commune in the Seine-Maritime department in the Normandy region in northern France. Between 1973 and 2017 the commune Saint-Lucien was part of Sigy-en-Bray.

Demographics
Inhabitants of Sigy are called sigeois and sigeoises.

Geography
A farming commune comprising several villages and hamlets covering a large area of land (27 km²).

Population

Places of interest
 The church of St. Martin, originally an abbey, dating from the thirteenth century.
 The chateau of Imbleval.
 A fifteenth-century sandstone cross.
 The church of St. Lucien, dating from the eleventh century.
 The chapel of St. Vincent at Bois-le-Borgne.

See also
Communes of the Seine-Maritime department

References

Communes of Seine-Maritime